Inatel is short for Instituto Nacional de Telecomunicações, the National Institute of Communications of Brazil.  The Institute is located on a 75,000 m2 campus in Santa Rita do Sapucaí in southern Minas Gerais.  Founded in 1965, it specializes in Electrical Engineering and Telecommunications education and research.

As of 2007, Inatel's monthly tuition was 950 reais, and about 5,000 students had graduated from the school.

The Institute sponsors the biennial International Workshop on Telecommunications held in odd-numbered years in Rio de Janeiro.

Researchers at Inatel publish and review technical papers for international conferences.

See also 
 List of universities in Brazil

References

External links 
 

Educational institutions established in 1965
Engineering research institutes
1965 establishments in Brazil
Universities and colleges in Minas Gerais
Research institutes in Brazil
Telecommunications in Brazil